Anania teneralis is a moth in the family Crambidae. It was described by Aristide Caradja in 1939. It is found in Russia and China.

Subspecies
Anania teneralis teneralis (China: Sichuan)
Anania teneralis tsinlingalis (Munroe & Mutuura, 1971) (China: Shaanxi)

References

Moths described in 1939
Pyraustinae
Moths of Asia